S. K. Balakrishnan (SKB) (26 July 1935 – 16 May 2002 in Madurai), was  Mayor of Madurai, Tamil Nadu, India between 1980 and 1982.

He was from Sourashtra community with Family name "SOMIN". His father died when he was young and his mother "S.K.Nagalammal" brought him up. He grew up with the guidance of his elder brothers S. K. Subbaraman and S. K. Rajaram. 

He belonged to ADMK Party and very close to then the Chief Minister of Tamil Nadu, M. G. Ramachandran Popularly known as MGR.

1935 births
2001 deaths
All India Anna Dravida Munnetra Kazhagam politicians
Tamil Nadu municipal councillors
Mayors of places in Tamil Nadu
20th-century Indian politicians
Politicians from Madurai